Uspenovka is a rural locality (a selo) and the administrative center of Uspenovsky Selsoviet of Bureysky District, Amur Oblast, Russia. The population was 269 as of 2018. There are 6 streets.

Geography 
Uspenovka is located on the right bank of the Raychikha River, 65 km west of Novobureysky (the district's administrative centre) by road. Staraya Raychikha is the nearest rural locality.

References 

Rural localities in Bureysky District